The 2019 World Junior Short Track Speed Skating Championships took place between January 25 and 27, 2019 in Maurice Richard Arena, Montreal, Canada.

Medal summary

Medal table

Men's events

Women's events

Participating nations 

  (1)
  (8)
  (3)
  (2)
  (2)
  (8)
  (8)
  (5)
  (2)
  (2)
  (3)
  (4)
  (8)
  (2)
  (8)
  (8)
  (8)
  (8)
  (3)
  (4)
  (6)
  (8)
  (1)
  (2)
  (8)
  (8)
  (5)
  (4)
  (2)
  (2)
  (8)
  (1)
  (1)
  (2)
  (8)
  (8)

See also
Short track speed skating
World Junior Short Track Speed Skating Championships

References

External links
 Official website 
Official protocol

World Junior Short Track Speed Skating Championships
World Junior Short Track Speed Skating Championships
International sports competitions hosted by Canada
Sport in Montreal
World Junior Short Track Speed Skating Championships
World Junior Short Track Speed Skating Championships